Phillip Leslie Wilcher (born 16 March 1958) is an Australian pianist and classical music composer who was a founding member of the children's music group the Wiggles. When Wilcher published his first work, "Daybreak", at the age of 14, he was one of the youngest classical composers in Australia.

Wilcher has published over 100 piano-related works and has performed both solo and with ensembles. Rita Crews for The Studio Quarterly Magazine described his style as "free-flowing, with an underlying romantic character, one in which melodic line and lyricism are all-important elements". His music has been broadcast by radio stations ABC-FM and 2MBS-FM – the latter has aired two documentaries, Wilcher and the French Connection and Wilcher's World.

Family and personal life
Phillip Leslie Wilcher was born to Naomi Joy Thompson (8 April 1929 – 21 June 2005) and Leslie James Wilcher (born 16 January 1923), a World War II veteran. Wilcher grew up in Camperdown. As of 2004, he resided in Concord and owns no cell phone, watch, or car: "My entire life since I was a boy was writing music and that has overshadowed everything.  I would be happy living in an oversized cardboard box with a piano and a blank sheet of manuscript paper".

Career

Early years
Wilcher started piano lessons at the age of eight; his first teachers were Gladys Woodward and Jean Teasel.  His interest in composing music began at an early age, before his teens.  At the age of 14, Wilcher published his first piano composition, "Daybreak", with the Sydney-based music company, J. Albert & Son, making him the then-youngest published composer in Australia. The track was later recorded in 2006 by John Martin on his CD, Ancient Rivers.

It was around that time Richard Gill awarded Wilcher a prize in the City of Sydney Eisteddfod for a work titled ‘Autumn Mists.’ Wilcher had entered it along with four other pieces, a Barcarolle, a Rhapsody, an Etude (which Gill praised as a “noble effort” that “rivaled Chopin’s Etude Opus 10 No. 4 in its ideas and difficulty”) and a smaller study he likened to the Opus 110 by Brahms, in both style and difficulty. In his autobiography 'Thinking Allowed' Wilcher recalls: "He was very kind to me, and encouraged me to continue on, suggesting – even foretelling – that mine was a name worth remembering."

For seven years, after he published "Daybreak", Wilcher was a student of composer and musicologist, Franz Holford, who was an editor at J. Albert & Son; he later composed music with Holford for over twenty years. One of the many highlights during Wilcher’s student years with Holford was a meeting with Fernando Germani who was organist of the Basilica of St. Peter in Rome during the reign of Pope Pius X11. Germani was visiting with Holford at his home in the Sydney suburb of Hunters Hill where the young Wilcher played for him Chopin’s Mazurka in Bb minor, Op. 24 No. 4. At the end of his performance, Germani was so moved by what he had heard he shed a tear. Wilcher's piano piece, "Autumn Rain", was published when he was 17, by J. Albert & Son. He also studied with classical musicians Neta Maughan and Elpis Liossatos, and began a thirty-year association with composer Miriam Hyde. Hyde is quoted as saying of Wilcher: "I find great satisfaction in the fact that we - Australia - have one composer who can succeed in a medium of sensitivity in spite of the ugliness and violence predominating in so many countries." In 1976 Wilcher became an assistant editor for J. Albert & Son's Classical/Educational Division. These were formative years for Wilcher, not only because of his work in the  classical/educational department but the world of pop/rock music as well. Through his work at Alberts, Wilcher came to know Vanda and Young, Bon Scott from AC/DC and particularly, Marc Hunter of Dragon. Wilcher on Marc Hunter: "At that time, I had no idea who he [Marc Hunter] was! Neither did he elaborate much on himself. We just spoke as if we were friends and true to his word, whenever he was at Alberts to record, he would always visit with me, and talk about music. Marc was a gentleman through and through and nothing short of stylish. After leaving Alberts in 1979, I never really saw him again, but my memory of him was such that when decades later he died, I cried. I will still shed a tear for him from time to time. He was a good man; someone I will never forget."

During the 1980s he worked for the Australian Broadcasting Corporation (ABC). According to Wilcher's autobiography, it was while working at the ABC  Wilcher came into contact with American Pulitzer-Prize winning composer Ned Rorem, who was to prove a major influence upon Wilcher's way of thinking, and how he considered creativity one's primary purpose for being. As Rorem had once written Wilcher: "The meaning of Life is to seek Life's meaning." Although musically they are of different worlds, Wilcher considers Rorem a mentor. The two shared a correspondence spanning over 30 years. Rorem to Wilcher: "Meanwhile, get your work done, there are too few people who know (as you and I know) what they want to do and how to do it."

Also in the 1980s, Wilcher developed a kinship with the friends and family of American pianist, Liberace, visiting them many times in Las Vegas. On his return to Australia after first visiting the US in May 1989, where he played for a celebration honouring Liberace's birthday at the Desert Inn, Wilcher received a letter of appreciation dated 6 July 1989 from Vince Fronza, who had read the eulogy at Liberace's funeral two years earlier. Fronza to Wilcher" "We managed a visit to Lee's (Liberace's) grave, and I touched that part of the mausoleum where his body is, spoke softly telling him of meeting you, and that we know he arranged it."

It was through Vince Fronza in May of 1992, that Wilcher met and befriended Ruby Keeler, (August 25, 1909 – February 28, 1993) the American actress, dancer, and singer who was paired on-screen with Dick Powell in a string of successful early musicals at Warner Bros. particularly, 42nd Street, and was Al Jolson's wife. Less than a year later, when Ruby Keeler died, Wilcher was to publish his own obituary honouring her in a local newspaper - the Western Suburbs Courier. In a remembrance titled 'Memories are like Ruby's", Wilcher wrote: Last year, while performing in the United States for the Liberace Foundation for the Creative and Performing Arts, I had the pleasure of dining with the legendary Ruby Keeler who died last weekend. She was Al Jolson's wife and held her own exact and satellite place in the expanse of 20th century theatre and film. The only thing unknown to me was the woman herself. Unpretentiously elegant in her summer frock and hat, she looked up at me from her table with Picasso eyes and smiled. I sensed there was an innate and articulate goodness about her. Like gold-plate on silver, this alone is worth remembering, for this alone was Ruby Keeler.

The Wiggles and children's music career
In the late 1980s, Wilcher began working in the Macquarie University early childhood music program. During his years of employment at Macquarie University’s Institute of Early Childhood, Wilcher was invited by music lecturer Emily App to conduct a guest-tutorial/master class, centred around the art of Music and music-making for children. Emily App wrote of Wilcher's class: “Students were amazed. I think it took their level of thinking about music to greater heights.” Likewise, the Dean, Alan Rice commented: “The enthusiasm of the master class and the student was very encouraging and a tribute to your commitment and expertise. It is only occasionally that we experience these peaks in our daily activities.”

During this time, Wilcher met Anthony Field, former member of the Australian rock group the Cockroaches, who was studying child development. According to Wilcher, Field asked him to help them record their self-titled debut album. Wilcher claims that he "contributed the most musically to the debut album", composing 75% of the music. The album included another piece he had composed at 14, "Summer Dance", which appeared on the album as "Archie's Theme". Wilcher was nicknamed Archie due to his admiration of Liberace.  He performed in two of the group's videos, "Get Ready to Wiggle" and "Dorothy the Dinosaur".

In 1992, Wilcher left the Wiggles. Their spokesperson, Dianna O'Neill, claims that he submitted a letter of resignation because he wanted to continue composing classical music. It was not until 26 November 1992, that Wilcher signed a Consumer Affairs Statement of Change in Persons Document - Registration No: M09577-8 - sent him by Jeff Fatt. Jeff Fatt gives the release date as 6 July 1992, but due to house renovations he was involved in at that time, and despite repeated requests from Wilcher to Fatt, Fatt did not forward the document for signing to Wilcher until 26 November 1992.

According to fellow founding member Greg Page, "Archie had considerable input into the arrangement of some songs on that first CD ... he is quite a musical genius ... However ... the musical direction of the Wiggles was changing". Australian Record Industry Association (ARIA) awarded the band members, including Wilcher, with gold and platinum certificates for the album. In two letters dated 21 April and 24 May 1995, to ABC Enterprises, Wilcher addressed certain concerns about his involvement with The Wiggles. Wilcher claims he was advised by Jeremy Fabinyi to write a letter of resignation so to officially release him from incurring any expenses for albums subsequent to the debut album. It had nothing to do with Wilcher leaving the group as a composer/writer for which he claims he had a verbal agreement. 

In 1993, Wilcher published a lesson plan for early childhood activities, A Musical Offering. The Australian composer and music educator, Dulcie Holland remarked: “Phillip Wilcher’s  'A Musical Offering' is an ingenious and imaginative approach to music. Through rhythm and rhyme, movement and sound, the very young person is gently introduced to music as an enjoyable activity. This will provide a wonderful foundation for a lifetime of musical experience and richness.” Holland would later set Wilcher's poem 'Sounds and Silence' from 'A Musical Offering' for women's choir. It was premiered by the Faye Dumont Singers and later published by EMI. Further praise for Wilcher's "A Musical Offering" came from principal Early Childhood lecturers Rosemary Harle: “It is refreshing to find Phillip Wilcher composing quality music for this very special market. A Musical Offering is so very appropriate for the young and commendable for its originality and captivating melodies.” and Laurie Le Claire, who wrote: “I am delighted with this music. It will appeal to children of all ages, and will challenge them in exciting ways. Phillip has a keen sense of the developing musical perceptions of children.”

In 2000, for reasons not entirely clear, the Wiggles had not only rerecorded their first album, but also renamed it "Wiggle Time" and removed all of his compositions. In 2005, when the Wiggles had become Australia's most successful children's act, he seemed to criticise the Wiggles in the press, but he has since stated that reporters had misrepresented him and that he chose to remain silent in the aftermath of their articles.

Classical career
Phillip Wilcher's has composed over 100 works for solo piano, pieces for soloist and piano as well as chamber ensembles. His music was described by The Sydney Morning Heralds Steve Dow as "an eclectic mix of classical and flim-flam". Wilcher's compositions are influenced by Chopin and J.S. Bach, and some of his works are notable for their use of Eastern scales, such as his Six Etudes, which uses Chinese and Japanese scales. He has composed music for pianist Aaron McMillan, and for musician and former ABC broadcaster, news reader and journalist, Clive Robertson. He has also set poetry by American librettist Jack Larson to music. Larson, whose prominence came about through portraying reporter Jimmy Olsen in the 1950s Superman TV series, gave to Wilcher a poem he had written based on a line penned by Swiss-born actor Marc Tissot, who was also heir to the Tissot watch company. Wilcher was later to set the poem "I Will Always Be ..." to music, offering it as a gift to both Larson and Tissot, with Larson responding accordingly, inscribing a photo to Wilcher quoting the opening line in good faith of his new-found friendship with Wilcher. Larson had a cameo in a late-1990s American Express card commercial, The Adventures of Seinfeld and Superman, which Larson mentions in his letter to Wilcher. 

In 2007, he composed "1791", a work honouring Mozart on the anniversary of his death, which was performed by oboist Rachel Tolmie, and the Bourbaki String Ensemble conducted by David Angell. It appeared on a compilation album, Into His Countenance (2008), which featured various artists performing Wilcher's compositions. His works have been included on several other CDs released by Jade Music and Wirripang. Pianist Jeanell Carrigan has recorded six CDs of his compositions, two for Publications by Wirripang. Carrigan, on the transportive nature of Wilcher's music, remarked: "Whether he wishes to transport the listener to a cafe in Paris or to the top of a mountain in Java, his skilful use of harmony, rhythm and tempi creates the perfect atmosphere." Rita Crews, in a review of Carrigan's album Shimmer (2004) for The Studio Quarterly Magazine, described Wilcher's style as "free-flowing, with an underlying romantic character, one in which melodic line and lyricism are all-important elements". 2MBS-FM's Mike Smith found it was of "a more openly romantic nature than in his earlier" work and he was "reminded of Rachmaninov, Albeniz and even Brahms". Smith has characterised Wilcher in further writings: In an article written for 2MBS-FM's Fine Music Guide titled "Attuned to the God of Small Things": "Phillip Wilcher does not like to be photographed. He describes himself as shy and somewhat reclusive, and he prefers the distance given by a sketch as opposed to a camera. Yet his music is more revealing of the soul than a camera can ever be. He does not attempt to hide behind virtuosity; his style is gentle and intimate."

As well as composing, Wilcher has performed both solo and with ensembles. This has included playing three times for the Liberace Foundation in Las Vegas. Of Wilcher's Las Vegas performance honouring Liberace's birthday at the Liberace Museum on 16 May 1992, the Liberace Club of Las Vegas had this to say in the Liberace Museum Newsletter:  “The 1992 Liberace Club of Las Vegas reunion pinnacled with the magnificent performance of a very talented young man from Australia. Seated behind Liberace’s sparkling grand piano in the Tivoli Lounge, Phillip Wilcher performed a beautiful repertoire of musical selections in a tribute to Liberace. His brilliant piano artistry favoured the audience with classical as well as popular musical pieces. His artistic sensitivity was also evident when he performed two of his own compositions, “Chopiniana”, a piece written for an 80th birthday celebration of a leading Australian composer, and “Consolation”, a beautiful melody depicting a peaceful serenity." 

His music has been broadcast by radio stations, ABC-FM and 2MBS-FM – the latter has aired two documentaries on his music, Wilcher and the French Connection and Wilcher's World. He has had an active public speaking career, and is an elected life member of Australasian Performing Right Association (APRA) and a board member of the Australian Music Teacher Magazine, for which he has written articles on Chopin, Brahms, Ravel, and music education. For two years, spanning 2005-2007, Wilcher's music was used as part of the soundtrack to the Australian soap opera, Neighbours.

In 2011, on learning of the death of Benjamin Daniel Breedlove who was an American YouTuber from Texas, Wilcher wrote a piece of music for string quartet titled "Remembered On Waking". The piece was performed and recorded by the Linden Quartet on Wilcher's album Heaven-Haven, published by Wirripang. Heaven-Haven was released in 2014. The music was performed by the Linden String Quartet. During production of the CD, Wilcher saw press reports about the fatal attack of 18-year-old Sydney resident Thomas Kelly; Wilcher was unable to separate the sorrow he felt for Kelly and his family from the sentiment he was trying to convey through his music. He eventually dedicated the project to Kelly and announced that proceeds from the album would benefit the Thomas Kelly Youth Foundation. 

Wilcher's 2017 album, The Voice of Love, is dedicated to Rosemary Eather, the host of the Australian children's television show, Good Morning!!! and friend to the composer and featured solo piano and piano and cello pieces. In 2021, Dr. Jeannine Baker, University of Wollongong, Australia wrote a report titled "Women in Early Australian Television Production as part of a Media Studies Grant project. Dr. Jeannine Baker writes: "This research inspired composer Philip Wilcher to donate his personal correspondence with Rosemary Eather to the National Film and Sound Archive NFSA (Canberra), correspondence which began when he was a child in the 1970s and lasted for decades. This valuable addition to the collection provides a rare example of both sides of the relationship between a female television personality and her audience." The performers on The Voice of Love, were Jeanell Carrigan (piano) and Minah Choe (cello). For the 2019 release of Spellbound, they were joined by Goetz Richter (violin). Pieces for various combinations of piano, violin and cello appear on the disc, with Wilcher's demanding Four Scherzi as a framing device. Brennan Keats, head of Wirripang publishing, contributed some insightful thoughts about Wilcher in the liner notes: "Phillip Wilcher is a man 'spellbound' by a profound spirituality that he rationalises with a natural philosophy that transcends most who live in the superficial world that confronts us today. There is a depth in him expressed by gentleness, kindness and demonstrated by the great love he exudes. All this is tempered by discipline, precision, delicacy and firmness of touch that only the truest, yet finest of musicians can expound. Of all the discs that he has produced, this is the most aptly named, in that it summarises a composer, musician and writer of integrity, and one of those rare beings who rises above all he encounters and yet remains very much one of us." 

Also in 2017, soprano, Ayse Goknur Shanal premiered two songs written for her by Wilcher at the Sydney Opera House, “In the Nape of a Dream” and “Spirit Song”, which was specifically written at the request of Goknur Shanal for inclusion in her 'Songs for Refugees' concert.
“The idea for this concert was a seed I have been watering since September 2015 when I saw the image of the Syrian toddler with the tiny jeans shorts and red t-shirt washed up on the Turkish shores. It broke me,” Goknur Shanal revealed. Together with cellist Kenichi Mizushima and pianist Harry Collins, this monumental evening, was organised by the grassroots network, Mums 4 Refugees, with the proceeds being donated to the charitable law firm, Human Rights for All, which represents refugee cases, on pro bono basis. "The concert include[d] works by, Massenet, Puccini, Giordano, as well as the world premiere of Spirit, written by Australian composer, Phillip Wilcher." (Sydney Opera House press release).

More recently, Wilcher has published a number of books, including an autobiography, titled 'Thinking Allowed'. He has written a full-scale piano recital for the virtuoso pianist Simon Tedeschi, and his music has attracted the attention of, and been performed by pianists overseas, notably Gerhard Eckle, Eduardo Fernandez, Lemuel Grave, Adam Jackson, and Emanuel Rimoldi.

Simon Tedeschi said of Wilcher's work: 'Phillip Wilcher's music dreamily evokes another time, another place. It has a searching quality that conjures up images of the great Romantic composers. Phillip wrote a recital for me, which I hope to present soon. Included in that are the ‘Etudes Tedeschi’ which have all the flavour and technical imagination of similar great works in the piano repertoire. I am proud to watch the evolution of this musician and composer who I count as a great personal friend.Other musicians who have performed and recorded Wilcher’s works include John Martin (piano), Rachel Tolmie (oboist), Marina Marsden (violinist), Justine Marsden (violist), Elizabeth Neville (cellist), Emily Long (violinist), Melissa Doecke (flautist), Martin Cooke (singer), Neil Fissenden (flautist), David Wickham (pianist), Minah Choe (cellist).

Wilcher continues to compose and release music, with his most recent release, Spellbound coming in 2019. Writing for the Music Teachers Association of Australia's "The Studio" journal, reviewer Marlicia Travis had this to say about the "Spellbound" CD:

In 2020, Wilcher was commissioned by Kim Radock to write a piano piece in memory of his mother, pianist Shirley Paton. The piece, titled "When eyes first saw, thy beauty was as this ..." was published by Wirripang. Subsequent to the commission and under the auspices of the Music Teacher's Association of Australia (MTA) the "Shirley Paton Memorial Scholarship" was founded, one criterion of the scholarship being that any pianist entering the competition is obliged to play Wilcher's piece. In 2022, Wilcher was awarded″ Third Prize for his composition, Rhapsody To The Memory of Richard Addinsell, in the 7th Vienna International Music Competition, conferred by the Franz Schubert Conservatorium. Also in 2022, Wilcher was awarded 3rd place diplomas in the Franz Schubert Conservatorium's "4th World Championship for Composition" Competition for his compositions "A Force Of Nature", "Into His Countenance" and "Piano Trio."

Later life
For the past 12 years, Wilcher has been a full-time carer for his father, who at 99 years of age is battling dementia. It is a different fight to the one he fought during World War II as a private in the Australian Military Services, 18th Australian Field Academy. Wilcher himself has said that he needs to remember his father's history more often, particularly during those times his thought processes appear impeded; to "show his compassion through patience" even more. "I am not feeling too good tonight. My head is driving me half crazy, but I suppose it will wear off during my sleep; anyway, I hope so ..." (Leslie James Wilcher in a letter to his wife, Naomi Joy Wilcher).

More recently, the highly esteemed American composer/pianist/educator, Matthew Bridgham, dedicated the song-cycle "Seasons of Seizing" to Wilcher and Wilcher's father. Bridgham worked closely with a local poet and English professor Liz Whiteacre to create the song-cycle expressing a certain intimacy with temporal lobe epilepsy. Matthew Bridgham: "In summer 2021, I worked with poet Liz Whiteacre (English Professor at the University of Indianapolis) to develop a series of poems based on my experience living with Temporal Lobe Epilepsy (TLE). Liz is very skilled at giving a voice to people with disabilities and has done a remarkable job notating my testimonies and crafting them into a beautiful set of ten poems." "Seasons for Seizing" will receive its world-premiere performance at Yale University in November 2022.

Following the death of Wilcher's father on August 20th, 2022, and as part of a community effort commandeered by Philippa Waters - a music teacher at James Sheahan Catholic High School in Orange - to transform an empty convent into a home for Ukrainian refugees at Molong, located in the central west of New South Wales, Wilcher gifted to the memory of Leslie James Wilcher the upright Mignon piano his father had bought him as a child, and on which he had composed his first published composition "Daybreak."

Illness
Hospitalisation
On October 11, 1997, at 39 years of age, Wilcher was admitted to Concord Repatriation Hospital following a five day history of progressively increasing altered behaviour. A summary of events as listed by Dr. M. G. Roxanas, who treated Wilcher at the time, touches upon accelerated speech patterns and "flights of ideas", mentioning anyone and everything from a Liberace concert Wilcher had attended as a child with his mother, jumping to other topics appropriate to his life including recent Wiggles-related articles, published while Wilcher was at hospital. A diagnosis of Mania was made and Wilcher was treated with Stelazine 5mgs nocte, Valium 5mgs nocte. After several weeks of treatment, Wilcher returned home and to normal employment.

On March 20, 2002, Dr Roxanas wrote Wilcher in light of his achievements: "I was thrilled that you are now receiving recognition and furthermore that mental illness is no barrier to a normal lifestyle. I am glad to hear that you are keeping well and I hope that international recognition will also come to you. Please let me know of your progress in life."

Assault
In May of 2003, Wilcher was assaulted not far from his home. Three youths wielding a plank of wood with rusty nails in it, beat him about his head and body. Wilcher sustained many injuries including an arterial bleed and a dislocated shoulder. He was near death on admittance to hospital in the early hours of Sunday morning, May 11, 2003. Wilcher pressed no charges, choosing forgiveness his sole/souls means of recovery, both for himself and for his assailants. Following the attack on him, he penned a letter in Concord's local Courier newspaper offering his concern for, and forgiveness to his assailants

Faith and religious beliefs

According to Wilcher's autobiography Thinking Allowed, on 10 March 1991, after being encouraged by Anthony Field to pursue the Catholic faith, Wilcher was baptised at the Mount St. Francis Friary, Kellyville, New South Wales. Fr Max Balabanski was the priest presiding. Anthony Field was sworn in as Wilcher's godfather, and Field's mother Marie was sworn in as his godmother. Also in attendance were Paul and John Field, after which a luncheon was held in the Field's family home. Wilcher is of no fixed denomination today, but acknowledges the importance of the teachings of Christ in his life.

Where Wilcher himself draws direct alignment between the writing of his music and creativity at the source, it was the late Raymond Smullyan who heard a correlation between Wilcher's music and  the religious or philosophical traditions of the East. Says Wilcher: I first came into contact with Raymond via YouTube after he had commented favourably on my music. Later, he invited me to submit a chapter about myself for the book In Their Own Words (The Piano Society 2009 Lulu Press) which he was editing with Peter Bispham : "I wish to compliment Taoism and Zen Buddhism by saying that I see a certain similarity between them and your music."

Bibliography
 
 
 
 
 
 
 
 
 
 

Discography
Studio albums
 Arabesque (2000)
 Out of the Blowing Sands (2001)
 Etchings  (2002)
 Shimmer (2004)
 Bundanon (2009)
 Wind Chimes (2012)
 Heaven Haven (2014)
 The Voice of Love (2017)
 Spellbound (2019)

Compilation albums
 Into His Countenance (2008)
 Goldleafing a Dream'' (2011)

Citations

General

Specific

External links
 

1958 births
Australian children's musicians
Australian classical musicians
Living people
Musicians from Sydney
The Wiggles members
Australian male composers
Australian composers
Australian pianists
Australian classical pianists
Male classical pianists